The OVW Television Championship was the secondary championship of Ohio Valley Wrestling (OVW), started on January 5, 2005. When the title was originally conceived, the champion defended against randomly selected opponents, with the winner receiving a check for $1000. The title became represented by a large trophy in the summer of 2005, before being changed to a traditional championship belt in the spring of 2006.

The inaugural champion was Brent Albright who defeated Seth Skyfire to win the championship on January 26, 2005. Jamin Olivencia holds the record for most reigns, with eight. At  days, Seth Skyfire's first reign is the longest in the title's history. David Lee Lorenze III, Jamin Olivencia and Mohamad Ali Vaez share the record for shortest reign in the title's history at less than a day. AJZ was the final champion, in his first reign. Overall, there have been 143 reigns shared among 79 wrestlers, with 12 vacancies.

Title history

Combined reigns

See also
OVW Heavyweight Championship
OVW Southern Tag Team Championship 
OVW Women's Championship

References

External links
  OVW Television Championship

Ohio Valley Wrestling championships
Television wrestling championships
Recurring sporting events established in 2005
2005 establishments in Kentucky